Large and complex financial institutions (LCFI) is a polite term for the bulge bracket banks. The context is that of systemic risk, a topic of particular concern to central banks, financial regulators and the Bank for International Settlements.

Most central bankers have had to deal with a large institution going bust, like Barings did in 1995. The main issue with a retail bank is to ensure that depositors are protected, but the regulators' main concern with a merchant bank is to ensure that there isn't a damaging loss of confidence in the banking system, and that all the trades, transactions and derivatives are wound up in an orderly way. If they are not, and all the traders and investors are suddenly forced to meet their obligations or liquidate their positions on the same day, there would be a crisis in the market and many institutions, rather than just the one, would probably go bust or at least suffer substantial losses in a dangerous spiral of falling prices and forced selling.

This is the background story to Long-Term Capital Management: there are many published articles on why that particular hedge fund failed, but very few on the systemic risk of all LTCM's counterparties attempting to unwind their positions at once. This is why the Federal Reserve Bank of New York intervened and organised a $3 billion bailout. 

Worse, at least one major European bank had 'hedged' or laid off risk on a significant percentage of its trading book by derivatives trades with LTCM but was a significant investor in LTCM itself. In other words, they had sold on the risks to LTCM, while buying back into them. Even without such errors, there is the worry that positions we think are hedged (effectively 'insured' against adverse market movements) might lose that protection when the counterparty who sold us those derivatives goes broke. An event which would, by its very nature, occur on the very day the markets go crazy.  

Nobody knows what would happen if one of the world's largest banks became severely distressed and was forced to suspend trading, except to say that it would be far worse than long-term capital management: firstly, because they have ongoing trades with every significant market player, everywhere; secondly, because the sums of money are so much larger. A bulge-bracket bank will, on any given day, have over a ten trillion dollars of open trades on the foreign exchange markets and in derivatives. 

Fortunately, there are regulatory measures to limit the risk of failure in a Large and Complex Financial Institution. All banks operate under the Basel Capital Accords, set up by the Bank for International Settlements, and their 'Risk' departments enforce "BIS 1" and nowadays the "BIS 2" risk accounting regimes. These are complex sets of rules allowing the bank – and its regulators – to know how much money is at risk in trading positions, no matter how complex, and how much 'regulatory' capital' must be set aside as a buffer against each trade going sour. Further, there can be no concentration of risk with one counterparty, no matter how large they may be. 

That last measure – the counterparty risk limit – is every market player's best protection against the failure of a trading partner. And if that player was the only company hit by their trading partner's bankruptcy, or one of a few dozen players caught in the same position, they would all be safe. But we still don't know what will happen if every market player, everywhere and in every market took the same hit.  Which is, of course, the perfect description of 'systemic risk'.

Banking